The Faulkner County Courthouse is located at 801 Locust Street in Conway, the county seat of Faulkner County, Arkansas.  It is a four-story masonry structure, built out of light-colored brick and concrete.  It has an H shape, with symmetrical wings on either side of a center section.  The center section has two-story round-arch windows, separated by pilasters, in the middle floors above the main entrance.  The fourth floor is set back from the lower floors.  Built in 1936 to a design by Wittenberg and Delony, it is an unusual combination of Colonial Revival and Art Deco architecture.

The building was listed on the National Register of Historic Places in 1995.

See also
National Register of Historic Places listings in Faulkner County, Arkansas

References

Courthouses on the National Register of Historic Places in Arkansas
Colonial Revival architecture in Arkansas
Art Deco architecture in Arkansas
Government buildings completed in 1936
Buildings and structures in Conway, Arkansas
National Register of Historic Places in Faulkner County, Arkansas